Jiří Dědeček (born 13 February 1953 Karlovy Vary) is a Czech musician, songwriter, poet, translator, writer and author of numerous radio and television programs. He performed in tandem with Jan Burian In the years 1973–1985.

Dědeček is a president of the Czech PEN Centre.

Education 
He graduated in librarianship from Charles University in Prague in 1976. In 1983 to 1987 He studied script writing in Film and TV School of the Academy of Performing Arts in Prague.

Discography (selection) 
 1990 – Zabili trafikantku	
 1996 – Kouzlo noční samoty	
 1998 – Žalozpěv pro lehký holky	
 2003 – Kdyby smrtka měla mladý
 2006 – Řekněte to mýmu psovi

References

External links

 Jiří Dědeček official page 
 Jiří Dědeček blog  
 
 Jiri Dedecek on PEN, politics, and pathos, Czech Radio, 17 December 2007 

Academy of Performing Arts in Prague alumni
1953 births
Musicians from Karlovy Vary
French–Czech translators
Czech male poets
Czech guitarists
Male guitarists
Czech translators
Czech science fiction writers
Czech bloggers
Czechoslovak male singers
Living people
20th-century translators
20th-century male writers
Male bloggers
Writers from Karlovy Vary
20th-century Czech male singers
21st-century Czech male singers